Rony Uzay Heparı (24 July 1969 – 31 May 1994) was a Turkish composer, music producer, songwriter and actor.

Biography
Uzay finished his education at Saint Benoit high school and proceeded to finish the Piano section of the Istanbul University. First, he played piano in Zuhal Olcay's album Küçük Bir Öykü Bu (This is a little story) and Akrep Nalan's album Dağ Çiçeği (Flower of the mountain). He later started working with Sezen Aksu on numerous musical projects including her album named Deli Kızın Türküsü (The ballad of the crazy girl).

His wife Zeynep Tunuslu (who had appeared on Survivor Turkey in 2011) was pregnant when Heparı died. Their son, Uzay Kanat Heparı, was born after his death.

Heparı died on 31 May 1994 as a result of injuries sustained in a motorcycle crash.

Works 
 Zuhal Olcay – Küçük Bir Öykü Bu (1989)
 Zuhal Olcay – İki Çift Laf (1990)
 Akrep Nalan – Dağ Çiçeği (1991)
 Erol Evgin – Erol Evgin İle Yeniden (1991)
 Aşkın Nur Yengi – Hesap Ver (1991)
 Sertab Erener – Sakin Ol! (1992)
 Sezen Aksu – Deli Kızın Türküsü (1993)
 Levent Yüksel – Med Cezir (1993)
 Aşkın Nur Yengi – Sıramı Bekliyorum (1993)
 Nükhet Duru – Nükhet Duru (1994)
 Sertab Erener – La'l (1994)
 Demet Sağıroğlu – Kınalı Bebek (1994)

Filmography 
 Gece, Melek ve Bizim Çocuklar (1992)

References

1969 births
1994 deaths
Musicians from Istanbul
Turkish record producers
Turkish composers
Turkish male film actors
20th-century composers
Road incident deaths in Turkey
Motorcycle road incident deaths
Burials at Zincirlikuyu Cemetery